Langtang National Park was established in 1976 as Nepal's first Himalayan national park and the country's fourth protected area. It encompasses 26 village communities and includes the Langtang valley. In the north and east it is linked with Qomolangma National Nature Preserve in Tibet Autonomous Region.
The eastern and western boundaries follow the Bhote Koshi and the Trishuli river, respectively.

The Gosainkunda lake is located at an elevation of  inside the park. The Dorje Lakpa range at  bisects the park from west–east to south–east. The summit of Langtang Lirung is the highest point in the park.

Langtang National Park is part of the Sacred Himalayan Landscape.

History 
In 1970, royal approval designated the establishment of Langtang National Park as the first protected area in the Himalayas. Under the Buffer Zone Management Guidelines the conservation of forests, wildlife and cultural resources received top priority, followed by conservation of other natural resources and development of alternative energy.

On 31 July 1992, Thai Airways International Flight 311 crashed into the park. The Airbus A310 was on approach to Tribhuvan International Airport in Kathmandu. All 113 people on board were killed.

In April 2015, the village of Langtang, located within the park, was destroyed by an avalanche of ice, rock and mud triggered by the April 2015 Nepal earthquake. At least 215 people were killed. In 2016, the International Astronomical Union named a 9.8km wide crater on Mars after the village, as a tribute.  The destruction of the village and other events taking place in Nepal before, during, and after the earthquake are documented in the 2022 Netflix mini-series Aftershock: Everest and the Nepal Earthquake.

Climate 

The climate of the park is dominated by the southwest summer monsoon. Temperatures vary greatly due to the extreme difference in altitude in the entire area. Most of the annual precipitation occurs from June to September. From October to November and from April to May, days are warm and sunny, and nights cool. In spring, rain at  elevation often turns to snow at higher elevations. In winter from December to March, days are clear and mild but nights near freezing.

Flora and Fauna 
Langtang National Park exhibits a high diversity of 14 vegetation types in 18 ecosystem types, ranging from upper tropical forests below  m altitude to alpine scrub and perennial ice.

References

External links

EnvironmentNEPAL Langtang National Park

National parks of Nepal
Biodiversity
1976 establishments in Nepal

pl:Park Narodowy Langtang